Artists, Writers & Artisans or AWA Studios is an American independent comic book publisher founded in November 2018 by Axel Alonso, Bill Jemas and Jonathan Perkins Miller.

History 
AWA Studios was founded in November 2018 by Axel Alonso and Bill Jemas from Marvel Comics, with the addition of Jonathan Perkins Miller from Fandom. While Alonso and Jemas are Chief Creative Officers, Miller is a Senior Council member. The initials in the company's name stand for "Artists, Writers & Artisans". Initial funders included Lightspeed Venture Partners and James Murdoch's Lupa Systems. The SISTER media investment firm also contributed funding in March 2020. Over time, a Creative Council was joined by J. Michael Straczynski, Reginald Hudlin, Garth Ennis, Gregg Hurwitz, Margaret Stohl and Frank Cho. In September 2019, AWA announced a Retail Council to be assembled.

American Ronin was presented as a potential book from AWA in June 2019. In August 2019, Straczynski announced a new shared universe for AWA, debuting in 2020 with The Resistance. During New York Comic Con 2019, AWA released Upshot Now No. 0. AWA Studios premiered with four titles, released in March 2020 under its Upshot imprint.

In June 2021, AWA announced the foundation of its own film/TV division, being helmed by Zach Studin as President.

Key people

Leadership team 
 Axel Alonso, chief creative officer (2018–present)
 Bill Jemas, chief executive officer and publisher (2018–2022)
 Jonathan Perkins Miller, chairman of the board (2018–present)

Creative council 
 J. Michael Straczynski (2018–present)
 Reginald Hudlin (2018–present)
 Garth Ennis (2018–2022)
 Gregg Hurwitz (2018–present)
 Margaret Stohl (2018–2022)
 Frank Cho (2018–2022)
 Laeta Kalogridis (2022–present)
 Joseph Kosinski (2022–present)
 Al Madrigal (2022–present)

Imprints

Current 
 Upshot

Former 
 iPOP
 Lesser Evils

List of works

Series

Announced series

One-shots

Magazines

Film and TV adaptations 

 Chariot
 Hotell
 Marjorie Finnigan, Temporal Criminal

References

External links
 

Comic book publishing companies of the United States